Cruel Youth is a band fronted by Teddy Sinclair, who previously recorded two solo albums under the name Natalia Kills. In 2016, Sinclair started the band with her husband, Willy Moon. The band's first extended play (EP), +30mg, was released on September 16, 2016.

Career

2015–present: Formation, +30mg, and upcoming debut album
Following their removal from the New Zealand version of The X Factor in 2015, Sinclair and Moon relocated to the United States. During that year they began to experiment with music, ultimately forming the band Cruel Youth. Their first release was "Mr. Watson", which was uploaded to the band's Soundcloud in February 2016. The first official single from the band, "Diamond Days" produced by Paro, was released on April 15, 2016. Paro also helped Sinclair and Moon write "I Don't Love You", a track from Cruel Youth's debut extended play (EP) +30mg. "Mr. Watson" was released as a single on May 20 and a video was released the following month. Following the video, Sinclair announced the band would be releasing an EP later that year. On September 7, the band released the single "Hatefuck" and announced the EP would be released on September 16. The following day, the official album art was released. In a statement to fans, Sinclair wrote, "Finally, after months of playing and perfecting our EP, +30mg is complete! And now we want you to hear it... With the EP comes our latest single, 'Hatefuck', a buzzing ballad I wrote about some of my very lowest moments. Of all the drugs, love is the worst. It seems to come with a set of handcuffs but no key. Some people hit rock bottom, some people crash right through and keep falling down - that was me, and if what came out of it was this song then it was certainly worth it." An official track list for the EP was released later that day. Fashion designer Tom Ford used the song "Diamond Days" in a 2016 runway show. The music video premiered on September 28, 2016. Prior to the release of the EP, Sinclair announced via her Twitter account that the name for the EP would be Cowboys and Angels, but it was subsequently changed to +30mg. In September 2016, Cruel Youth announced they would be joining Kiiara for a US tour beginning in Los Angeles, and finishing in New York City.

In 2018, Cruel Youth released the non-album singles "Devil in Paradise" and "Portrait of a Female". In 2022, the band released the single "Mr. Badman" for the soundtrack of The Invitation.

In 2023, the band is expected to release their debut studio album with lead single, "Wait in the Benz".

Discography

Studio albums

Extended plays

Singles
As lead artist 

As featured artist

References 

2016 establishments in the United States
All-female bands
Musical groups established in 2016
Feminist musicians
American alternative rock groups
American musical trios